Giovanni Francesco Arcasio (23 January 1712 – 25 November 1791) was an Italian jurist, who taught civil law in University of Turin from 1749 to 1791.

Biography
Arcasio was born in Bisagno, studied in Turin where he obtained a degree in law in 1733. He was also facile with Latin and erudite in Ancient Roman law. In 1743, King Carlo Emmanuele III named him professor of civil law. He wrote extensive commentaries on law: Commentaria iuris civilis (1782, 1784). A conservative and contemplative man, every year he would retreat for a month to a Camaldolese monastery. He was a member of the local scholarly societies of Sampaolina and Filopatria. In 1777, he was named Senator.

References

1712 births
1791 deaths
18th-century Italian writers
18th-century Italian male writers
18th-century Italian jurists
Writers from Turin
Academic staff of the University of Turin 
University of Turin‎ alumni